I Gede Agus Mahendra (born on 1 June 2002) is an Indonesian professional footballer who plays as a left-back for Liga 1 club Bali United.

Career

Bali United
On 24 February 2021, Mahendra officially signed a contract with Bali United. He made his debut on the last match of 2021–22 Liga 1.

Career statistics

Club

Notes

References

External links
I Gede Agus Mahendra at Bali United Official Website

2002 births
Living people
People from Denpasar
Indonesian footballers
Liga 1 (Indonesia) players
Association football fullbacks
Sportspeople from Bali
Bali United F.C. players
Balinese people